Michole Briana White (born May 29, 1969) is an American actress. She began her career while appearing on numerous of television sitcoms before portraying Lucille Flenory on the Starz' crime series Black Mafia Family (since 2020). White also appeared in many films throughout her career including Out of Darkness (1994 TV Movie),         
Courage Under Fire (1996), Volcano and Convict 762 (both in 1997),                                 
She Hate Me and The Break-Up Artist, (both in 2004), Into the Fire (2005 TV Movie),              
The Strange Eyes of Dr. Myes & Lila & Eve (both in 2015), Spell (2018),                          and The Fight That Never Ends (2021 TV Movie).

Life and career 
White was born in Maywood, Illinois. She is known for her role as attorney Fatima Kelly in the A&E series 100 Centre Street. She has also guest starred in a number of notable television series namely L.A. Law, The Wonder Years, The Fresh Prince of Bel-Air, Family Matters, Blossom, Martin, Living Single, Ellen, Chicago Hope, Law & Order: Special Victims Unit and among other series. She also had regular role in the WB sitcom Muscle in 1995.

White has also co starred in the films Encino Man (1992), Courage Under Fire (1996), Volcano (1997), the Spike Lee films 25th Hour (2002) and She Hate Me (2004), and the 2010 film Faster.

In 2009, she co-starred in the traveling stage production Stick Fly.

Filmography

Film/Movie

Television

Awards and nominations

References

External links
 
 Broadwayworld.com

1969 births
20th-century American actresses
21st-century American actresses
Actresses from Illinois
African-American actresses
American film actresses
American stage actresses
American television actresses
Living people
People from Maywood, Illinois
20th-century African-American women
20th-century African-American people
21st-century African-American women
21st-century African-American people